The artistic gymnastics competitions at the 2013 Mediterranean Games in Mersin took place between 21 June and 24 June at the Mersin Gymnastics Hall.

Athletes competed in 14 events.

Participating nations
Seventeen nations have registered for artistic gymnastics competitions; sixteen in men's competitions and eleven in women's competitions.

  Albania
  Algeria
  Croatia
  Cyprus
  Egypt
  France
  Greece
  Italy
  Lebanon
  Libya
  Macedonia
  Monaco
  Slovenia
  Spain
  Syria
  Tunisia
  Turkey

Schedule

Medal summary

Men's events

Women's events

Medal table

References

 
Sports at the 2013 Mediterranean Games
2013
2013 in gymnastics
Gymnastics competitions in Turkey